Venkata Ratnam or Venkataratnam is a given name. Notable people with the given name include:

 Kakani Venkata Ratnam (died 1972), former Cabinet Minister in Andhra Pradesh, India
 Raghupathi Venkataratnam Naidu (1862–1939), Indian social reformer